The Ducal Palace of Modena is a Baroque palace in Modena, Italy. It was the residence of the Este Dukes of Modena between 1452 and 1859. It currently houses a portion of the Italian Military Academy.

History

The palace occupies the site of the former Este Castle, once at the periphery of the city. Although generally credited to Bartolomeo Avanzini, it has been suggested that advice and guidance in the design process had been sought from Pietro da Cortona, Gian Lorenzo Bernini and Francesco Borromini.

The Palace has a Baroque façade from which the Honour Court and the Honour Staircase can be accessed.

In 1696, Marcantonio Franceschini was commissioned to create a frescoed ceiling for the central Sala d'Onore ("Hall of Honour") for the marriage of Rinaldo d'Este to Princess Charlotte Felicity of Brunswick. The Salottino d'Oro ("Golden Sitting Room"), covered with gilded removable panels, was used by Duke Francis III as his main office.

Modern use

The Palace currently houses the Italian Military Academy, the Military Museum and a library.

Military ceremonies are held in the Honour Court.

Este births and deaths
Being a residential palace, a significant number of Este family members were born or died at the palace including:

Isabella d'Este (1635–1666) - born at the palace.
Rinaldo d'Este, Duke of Modena (1655–1737) - born and died at the palace.
Duchess Charlotte of Brunswick-Lüneburg (1671–1710) - died at the palace in childbirth (the child also died).
Maria Teresa Felicitas d'Este (1726–1754) - born at the palace.
Ercole III d'Este, Duke of Modena (1727–1803) - born at the palace.
Maria Fortunata d'Este (1731–1803)

See also
 List of Baroque residences
Modena
House of Este
Santo Peranda - painted The defeat of the Saracens for the palace.

Gallery

References

Houses completed in 1452
Baroque architecture in Modena
Este residences
Tourist attractions in Emilia-Romagna
Buildings and structures in Modena
Palaces in Emilia-Romagna
Baroque palaces in Italy
Royal residences of the Duchy of Modena and Reggio